Castellet may refer to:

People
Queralt Castellet, Spanish snowboarder

Places
France
Castellet-en-Luberon, commune in the Vaucluse department
Castellet-lès-Sausses, commune in the Alpes-de-Haute-Provence department

Spain
Castellet i la Gornal, municipality in the comarca of the Alt Penedès
Sant Vicenç de Castellet, municipality in the comarca of Bages

See also
Le Castellet (disambiguation)